Ethnikos Piraeus (Greek: Εθνικός Πειραιώς) is a Greek multisport club based in Piraeus. It was founded in 1923. The full name of the club is Ethnikos Omilos Filathlon Pireos/Phalirou or Ethnikos OFPF (Greek: Εθνικός Όμιλος Φιλάθλων Πειραιώς-Φαλήρου/Εθνικός ΟΦΠΦ), which means National Club of Fans of Piraeus and Phalerum. Ethnikos has sections in football, basketball, volleyball, waterpolo, swimming. In most of these sports, Ethnikos has won titles and honours. The most successful department is by far the water polo, which has won many domestic and european titles. Nevertheless, the most popular is the football team, which had a remarkable tradition in the first division in the past.

Departments
Ethnikos Piraeus F.C., the football team is playing in Gamma Ethniki (2021–22).
Ethnikos Piraeus B.C., the basketball team is playing in Beta Ethniki (2021–22). 
Ethnikos Piraeus V.C., the women's volleyball team is playing in A' ESPEDA (2021–22)
Ethnikos Piraeus W.P.C., the water polo team is playing in A1 Ethniki both men and women (2021–22)
Ethnikos Piraeus Swimming team

History

Early years

Ethnikos was founded in 1923 under the name Keravnos. One year later the club was renamed to Young Boys Titan. On 23 December 1924, Young Boys Titan merged with the club Peiraikos Podosfairikos Omilos and renamed to Ethnikos. During the early years Ethnikos enjoyed successes by the teams of football, waterpolo and swimming. Ethnikos swimming team won two Panhellenic championships in 1926 and 1927. Ethnikos water polo team won the first championship organised by SEGAS in 1926 and another one in 1931. Ethnikos football team won the second football cup of the Greek football in 1933. The football team also was the runner-up in the first Greek Panhellenic Championship, in 1928. Ethnikos claimed the championship two more times. The first time was in 1929, when it won the championship of Piraeus and qualified for the Panhellenic championship but this wasn’t held. The second time was in 1935, when Ethnikos was the winner of championship of South Greece and qualified for the final of Panhellenic Championship, but eventually the final wasn’t held.

The first postwar years
After Second World War Ethnikos created a strong team both football and waterpolo. The water polo team won its third national championship in 1948 which was the last before the upcoming dynasty. The football team was runner-up of 1955-56 Greek championship having finished one only point behind the head of the standings, Olympiacos. The next season Ethnikos was the heavy favorite for the title but it was denied the title because of a strict punishment by EPO. The reason of punishment was the conduct of football games with the exiled football team of Hungary. Ethnikos was four points ahead of the second placed team with four matches remaining. Ethnikos water polo team dominated entirely in Water Polo Championship, taking the majority of titles between 1950 and 1990. Ethnikos won 18 consecutive championships from 1953 to 1970 and 14 consecutive championships from 1972 to 1985. Moreover, the club was unbeaten for 13 years between 1951 to 1964, a record that the team holds till now. Ethnikos also holds the record for the most unbeaten championships with 29. The team was the first Greek one to reach the final-4 of LEN's Champions League, the elite club competition in Europe, in 1981 when the Greeks faced Jug, Vasas and Spandau.

Last years
The fall of football team of Ethnikos started in the early of 1990's. In 1989-90 season Ethnikos was relegated to Beta Ethniki (second division) for first time, after 35 consecutive appearances A Ethniki (first division). The football team of Ethnikos owed a big part of success in the longtime President Dimitris Karellas. After his death in 1993, the football team of Ethnikos didn't manage to return to successes. Water polo team continued to give successes to Ethnikos. Ethnikos women's water polo team, winning the LEN trophy cup in 2010, won the first European cup of Ethnikos. In 2011 Ethnikos created a field hockey team. Ethnikos Piraeus field hockey has won two championships so far in 2012 and 2014. Overall, Ethnikos football team has two official second place finishes in Greek championship (1928, 1956), one unofficial second place in 1935 when the final was not held and one stolen championship in 1957. The men's water polo team has 38 championships and 12 cups in contrast to its women's team that has three championships and one LEN Trophy. The football team has 49 appearances in the top division while the water polo team has only two absences in 2010 and 2013 due to relegation.

Sport facilities

The first years Ethnikos was playing in Neo Phaliron Velodrome. In the place of velodrome, the Karaiskakis Stadium was built in 1960 and became the new home of Ethnikos. Ethnikos had been playing in Karaiskaki until 2004, when the stadium renovated. The next years Ethnikos played in different stadiums. It played in Hellinikon Stadium as well as many other ones all over Attica. The water polo team plays in national natatorium of Piraeus, known also as “Petros Kapageroff” formerly Papastrateio. The basketball and volleyball team play in Panagiotis Salpeas gymnasium in the centre of Piraeus.

Rivalries

Piraeus Derby 

Ethnikos's traditional rival is Olympiacos. Ethnikos was founded earlier than Olympiacos and these two clubs are the biggest in Piraeus. Ethnikos is believed that it represents the upper and middle class of Ethnikos whereas Olympiacos is believed that it represents the working class of Piraeus. Olympiacos was suggested as a name for Ethnikos but the founding members rejected it and Notis Kamperos, Olympiacos founder used it for his team. Karaiskakis Stadium today's home of Olympiacos has been the traditional home of Ethnikos but since the demolition of the old stadium, Ethnikos has not been able to use the new Karaiskakis Stadium because of the large operating expenses that Olympiacos is demanding. This has led to Ethnikos using other stadiums as a home ground. Ethnikos's home ground issue is one of the biggest in Greek football in the last 22 years and authorities claim that a new stadium could be built for Ethnikos but not in the N. Faliro - Kastella area of Piraeus where the heart of Ethnikos is, but on the outskirts of Piraeus. This has affected the fanbase of the team and has resulted in a decrease of fans in Piraeus.

Honours

Summary 
Ethnikos is the fifth most successful Greek club in terms of total titles won in domestic and european team sports competitions. In addition, Ethnikos is the fourth most successful Greek club in men's team sports competitions.

Ethnikos Piraeus F.C.
Greek Football Championship
Runners-up (3): 1928, 1935*, 1956
Greek Cup
Winner (1): 1933

Ethnikos Piraeus Water Polo Club
Greek Championship
Winner (38) (record): 1926, 1931, 1948, 1953, 1954, 1955, 1956, 1957, 1958, 1959, 1960, 1961, 1962, 1963, 1964, 1965, 1966, 1967, 1968, 1969, 1970, 1972, 1973, 1974, 1975, 1976, 1977, 1978, 1979, 1980, 1981, 1982, 1983, 1984, 1985, 1988, 1994, 2006
Greek Cup
Winner (12): 1953, 1954, 1955, 1956, 1957, 1958, 1984, 1985, 1988, 1991, 2000, 2005.

Ethnikos Piraeus Water Polo Club (women)
LEN trophy
Winner (2): 2010, 2022
Greek Championship
Winner (3): 1988, 1990, 1992

Ethnikos Field Hockey Club
Greek Field Hockey Championship
Winner (2): 2012, 2014

Ethnikos Swimming team
Panhellenic Championships (3): 1926, 1927, 1949
Panhellenic Championships (Men's tournament) (10): 1926, 1927, 1930, 1948, 1949, 1950, 1951, 1982, 1983, 2010

European Honours

References

External links
Official page
Unofficial page about Ethnikos Piraeus

 
1923 establishments in Greece
Field hockey clubs established in 2011
Field hockey clubs in Greece
Multi-sport clubs in Piraeus
Sports clubs established in 1923